Wing Commander Albert Ernest Sims  (1896–1981), nicknamed George, was a British composer, conductor, and director of music of the Central Band of the Royal Air Force.

Sims was born in 1896 in Newton Heath, Manchester.

He studied music theory, composition and conducting at the Royal Academy of Music in London and then at the Royal College of Music, also in London. He was commissioned a flying officer (director of music) from warrant officer rank in 1938 and retired with the rank of wing commander. He composed several marches for band including the official march of the Royal Air Force College.

Compositions 
 1950: "March of the Royal Air Forces Association"
 1950: "R. A. F. General Salute ... Advance in Review Order"
 "Royal Air Force College March"
 "Superna Petimus"

Further reading 

 Ian Kendrick: Music in the air - The story of music in the Royal Air Force, Baldock: Egon Publishers Ltd., 1986, 174 p.
 Kenneth Walter Berger: Band encyclopedia, Kent, Ohio: Band Associates, 1960, 604 p.

English conductors (music)
British male conductors (music)
20th-century English composers
20th-century English musicians
1896 births
1981 deaths
Royal Air Force airmen
Royal Air Force officers
Royal Air Force personnel of World War II
Lieutenants of the Royal Victorian Order
Officers of the Order of the British Empire
Alumni of the Royal Academy of Music
Alumni of the Royal College of Music
People from Newton Heath
20th-century British conductors (music)
20th-century British male musicians
Royal Air Force musicians